Jules Gaudin (born 9 May 2000) is a French professional footballer who plays as a midfielder for  club Guingamp.

Career
In the summer of 2020, Gaudin signed an aspirant contract with Guingamp. He made his professional debut with the club in a 3–0 win over Amiens on 1 May 2021.

On 4 December 2021, Gaudin was loaned to Bastia-Borgo in the Championnat National until the end of the 2021–22 season.

International career
Gaudin is a youth international for France, having represented the France U16s and France U17s.

References

External links
 
 
 EA Guingamp Profile

2000 births
Living people
Sportspeople from Saint-Brieuc
French footballers
France youth international footballers
Association football midfielders
En Avant Guingamp players
FC Bastia-Borgo players
Ligue 2 players
Championnat National 2 players
Championnat National 3 players
Championnat National players
Footballers from Brittany